Leroy Russell Junior (born 4 November 1987), better known by his stage names Tommy Lee and Tommy Lee Sparta, is a Jamaican dancehall artist from Flankers Montego Bay, Jamaica.  Tommy Lee Sparta gained popularity as a member of Adidjahiem Records and the associated Portmore Empire crew under the leadership of Vybz Kartel.  He has been a controversial figure in dancehall due to his self-described "Gothic Dancehall" style, which often features dark and Satanist-inspired subject matter.

Career
Tommy Lee Sparta began deejaying in late 2007 at Snipa Studios in Flanker, where he recorded his first song, "Spartan Story."  During this time, he performed as an opening act for local shows, including several from Portmore artist Vybz Kartel.  Kartel, noticing that the artist was receiving positive responses from the crowd, invited him to move to Kingston and become a part of the Portmore Empire, Kartel's music crew.  Tommy Lee Sparta, however, was reluctant to leave his family and neighborhood, and declined the offer.

According to Tommy Lee Sparta, it wasn't until his performance at Vybz Kartel's Birthday Bash on 7 January 2010 that he decided to take the idea of being a musician seriously, and he soon accepted the offer to become an official member of the Portmore Empire crew.  "Warn Dem," released in November 2010, was Tommy Lee Sparta's first recognized hit, based on a riddim by Da Wiz, his original producer from Snipa Studios.  The accompanying music video, directed by Dk Konsepp, was also a first for the artist.

Tommy Lee Sparta's breakthrough hit came with "Some Bwoy (Link Pon Wi Chain)" on the 2011 So Bad Riddim. However, it wasn't until well after Kartel's arrest and the release of the music video in 2012, under new management from Junior "Heavy-D" Fraser, that the single gained traction.  The single worked its way to the number one spot of many of Jamaica's informal music charts, including Pree Dis and Entertainment Report, and the video was in heavy rotation on Caribbean stations such as RETV, Hype TV, and Tempo Networks.  "Some Bwoy," along with follow-up singles such as "Psycho," "Buss a Blank," We want paper  and "Shook (Uncle Demon)," gave Tommy Lee Sparta significant exposure locally as well as internationally and in 2012 he was not only the headlining artist for both the International  Reggae Sumfest show  in Montego Bay and the Sting music festival in Portmore but he was also the first full blown dancehall artist from the second city Montego Bay to do so he was 23 years old at the time.

In May 2012, Adidjahiem Records was shut down, citing the legal issues of owner Vybz Kartel and lack of ability to represent/promote artists as reasons for the closure.  Since then Tommy lee sparta has been an independent artist with his own record label Guzu musiq and his musical group the SPARTA Camp which consist of artistes like Dre x Sparta and more.

In September 2012, Tommy Lee announced that he would be changing his stage name to Tommy Lee Sparta for trademark purposes, and to differentiate himself from Mötley Crüe drummer Tommy Lee and actor Tommy Lee Jones.  The element "Sparta" was derived from an informal name given to the part of Flankers where he grew up.  The move was suggested by his lawyer as a way to thwart potential copycat musicians from impersonating the artist.

Usain Bolt, Warren Weir and several other Jamaican sprinters have stated their appreciation of Tommy Lee Sparta and Adidjahiem Records, going so far as to flash the hand sign for the clique popularized by Tommy Lee Sparta after Jamaica won all three medals at the men's 200 metres in the 2012 Summer Olympics.  In response, Tommy Lee Sparta released remixes for his songs "Psycho" and "Some Bwoy" with altered lyrics paying tribute to the Jamaican sprinters.

Bounty Killer feud
In September 2012, a feud formed between Tommy Lee Sparta and Alliance leader Bounty Killer over a series of Twitter posts that were perceived as an insult to Tommy Lee Sparta.  One such message from Bounty Killer on 8 September said, "Christmas is 4 christ so nuh demon or devil cyaah win we a bloodclaat all a dem a dead a sting!!!"  This was widely believed to be a reference to Tommy Lee Sparta's "Uncle Demon" persona and a threat against the artist regarding the upcoming Sting music festival on Boxing Day.  Bounty Killer, however, denied that the tweet was directed towards Tommy Lee Sparta, stating that the message was against the devil and not any artist in particular. Tommy Lee Sparta said of the slight that he had great respect for the artist as an elder dancehall musician, and that as the statement was probably made to garner publicity, he would not respond with any disrespect.

However, just a little over a week later, Tommy Lee Sparta released the music video for a new diss track directed towards Bounty Killer entitled "Goat Head."  Bounty Killer responded the next month with two diss songs of his own, "Di Gaad" and "Nyammy Lee."  As a result of the growing feud, the two artists were slated to clash at the 2012 Sting music festival, with Bounty Killer comparing the matchup as equivalent to "a giant and an ant."  However, when Sting's lead promoter, Isaiah Laing, implied that Tommy Lee Sparta might have a chance of defeating the veteran artist, Bounty Killer saw the remark as an insult and cancelled his performance.  During Tommy Lee Sparta's performance at Sting, he expressed his support and respect for Bounty Killer, and both artists have since stated they consider the feud to be over.

(Awards accolades tours and chart success  ) in 2012 Tommy lee sparta was nominated for two of Jamaica’s youth views awards one in collaboration of the year for the single informer ft vybz kartel and top charting song of the year for his hit song psycho one to which he copped top charting song of the year    in the following year 2013 he announced new dates for some international shows in Canada after they were postponed due to a medical condition and he welcomed the new year with a google endorsement as google play described him as an artist to watch for in 2013 in Kenya he won breakthrough artist of the year  Later Tommy lee sparta released the music video for his fully animated music video captain sparta that became a big hit for kids in Sweden ranging from ages 12 –19 which lead to the artist securing a children show on April 24 but Sweden was not the only place he was visiting because this was also his first European tour which would see the artiste make appearances in Holland, France, Sweden, Switzerland, Germany, and England over a six week time frame and had a successful 2013 tour  fans were happy when Tommy lee sparta released one of his many eps titled sparta boss that was released on September 23, 2013 but they were also more overjoyed to find out Tommy lee’s hit song psycho was added as a soundtrack for the global video game franchise grand theft auto 5. In 2016 he was featured on a song called Evil from Bonez MC and RAF Camora that charted at number 51 on the German charts. In 2018 he entered the billboard reggae albums top 10 chart at number 9 with his new creator ep 

Tommy Lee Sparta was  nominated in 2020 for an IRAWMA (international reggae & music awards) award in the category of best dancehall stage craft entertainer. Tommy Lee Sparta’s latest hits include blessings, rich badness, under vibes, tattoo, procreator, power struggle, and lord luci. Tommy Lee Sparta has amassed 1 million subscribers on his YouTube vevo channel on September 18, 2021 thanks to his vastly large cult following he declared his appreciation for the feat on his Instagram account this is a clear indication that the Sparta fanbase is one of the most loyal fanbase in the game .

Personal life
Russell was born in 1987 and grew up in Flanker an unofficial residential community located just east of Sangster International Airport in Montego Bay. He has 4 sisters and an older brother. One sister, Denise Baker, lives in Allentown, PA with her husband Kirk Baker, Russell's older cousin Andrew Henry and his five children: Darion "Deejay" Henry, the eldest, Donovan "Popatime" Henry and Gerard Henry. 
Russell obtained an American Visa in June 2014.  Tommy Lee Sparta says that he only "pree music" in his 2013 sting performance.
He describes his upbringing as difficult, having lost his father at the age of 9.  Russell attended Anchovy High School in the nearby town of Anchovy.  He had his first child at the age of 14 while he was in eighth grade by his high school sweetheart, Donna who was then in the eleventh grade.

In February 2014 he was accused along with four others in connection with a lottery scam, he was proven to be innocent of the lottery scamming in 2019. He was unlawfully detained for nearly a week and was ordered to be released by a judge in May 2019 

In March 2021, he pled guilty to illegal possession of a firearm and ammunition and was sentenced to three years in prison.

Discography

Extended plays
2012: "Pussy Mechanic" (UIM Records)
2012: "Gal Gimme Wine" (UIM Records)
 2012: Psycho (Tad's Record Inc)
 2012: Grim Reaper (UIM Records)
 2013: Save Dem Soul (Da Wiz Records)
2013: "Bun Nu Nu " (UIM Records)
 2012: Some Bwoy (Young Vibez Production)
 2013: Spartan Soulja (Guzu musiq)
2014: "Dream" (UIM Records)
2015: "Big Bike" (UIM Records)
2015: "Rebirth"  (UIM Records)
2017: "Diamond Blessings"  (Damage musiq)
2018: "New Creator" (Ricardo Gowe Record)   
2019 :”Blessings (damage musiq)
2019 :”Under vibes (Falmouth dinesty king records)
2019 :”Rich badness(herah musik production)
2020 :”Procreator (damage musiq)
2020:”Tattoo(night owl musik)

LPs
 2012: Grim Reaper - LP (UIM Records)
 2012: Bay Badness - LP (UIM Records - TJ Records)
 2013: Save Dem Soul - LP (UIM Records - Da Wiz Records)
 2013: Sparta Hits - LP (UIM Records - Guzu Musiq)
 2013: Uncle Demon - LP (Guzu Musiq)
 2013:  Sparta Boss - LP (Guzu Musiq)
 2017: Diamond Blessings - LP (Damage Musiq)
 2018: New Creator - LP (Guzu Musiq)
 2019: Reincarnation - LP (Boss Lady Muzic, Inc.)
 2021: Transition - LP (Boss Lady Muzic, Inc.)

Features
2016 "Evil" (Bonez MC & RAF Camora feat. Tommy Lee Sparta)
2016 “Kuraiyoru” (Kohh feat. Tommy Lee Sparta)
2017 "Scotch Bonnet" (Ramriddlz feat. Tommy Lee Sparta)
2017 "Crossover" (Sean Kingston feat. Tommy Lee Sparta)
2018 "Run With It" Madeaux feat. Tommy Lee Sparta)
2019 "Blessings" (Damaqe)
2020 "Bad Gyal" (feat. Skilibeng, Jucee Froot & Tommy Lee)
2021 "LOVE PRISON" (KILLY feat. Tommy Lee Sparta)

External links
  Tommy Lee Sparta website (offline as of 09/18/2017)

References

Jamaican dancehall musicians
Jamaican reggae singers
Jamaican male singers
People from Montego Bay
Living people
1987 births